Piotr Damasiewicz, also known as Damaś (born April 11, 1980, in Wroclaw), is a Polish composer, trumpeter, multi-instrumentalist, educator, traveller and curator of international music platforms. In addition to the trumpet, he studied double bass, piano and classical singing - including Gregorian chant - choral and chamber conducting, arrangement and composition. In his work, he uses the language of jazz, 20th century classical music, ethnic music, and modern music, along with European improvised music.

Damasiewicz has represented Poland on four international music platforms: Take Five Europe, Jazz Plays Europe Laboratory, Art Meetings, and Melting Pot Laboratory (Jazztopad). In the last two, as a leader, composer and instrumentalist, he developed the idea of open improvisation in contact with other fields of art. He is currently studying for his doctorate at the Instrumental Department of Feliks Nowowiejski Academy of Music in Bydgoszcz.

History 
For over a decade, Damasiewicz has been on a musical and spiritual journey. 

In 2019, as a pilgrim-musician, he travelled 4,186 km on foot from the Ukrainian border to Santiago de Compostela. During the six-month journey, he made over 100 recordings of his solo impressions in various sacred spaces, where he examined their acoustic characteristics. A year earlier, together with his partner Agnieszka Kabath, he lived and recorded his improvisations in an old chapel in Vin Sur Caramy in Provence, where he immersed himself in prayer and meditation with sound, recording several dozen hours of music. Throughout his journey he interacts with various individuals. These informal, spontaneous meetings generate unique amalgamations and understanding at a deep level. One of the most meaningful experiences in his life was the visit to the double bass player Barry Phillips, with whom he spent time talking and making music. Similar events were visits to the home of Antoin Rooney in New York, or the home of the drummer Ngom Babu Herim in Zanzibar. Face-to-face meetings with masters have been key moments in the development of his musical personality.

Band activities and composing 
The work and play of Damasiewicz can be heard in various authorial editions. From the multiplayer ensemble "Power Of The Horns,” where he writes compositions for 8 to 18 musicians, through chamber quintets, quartets, trios, such as "Mnemotaksja,” "Into the Roots,” "Viennese Connections” or "ImproGraphic,” to orchestral works such as "Hadrons” (a symphonic quintet plus improvisers), or "Suite 29” (an orchestra of over a dozen improvisers), and ending with solo compositions (the piece "LS Dam" for cello solo) or solo improvisations on trumpet.

His music resonates also in projects where he is a sideman, co-leader or co-author: "VeNN Circles,” "Red Trio Quintet,” "Hangar Music” as well as "Elements” and "Sesto Elemento” in collaboration with Maciej Garbowski.

Compositional works 
The most significant orchestral works by the artist include: "Hadrons" for string quintet and jazz band commissioned by the Jazztopad festival, "Suite 29" written for the World Jazz Days for Polish Radio Program II, "Composition for 27 improvisers" as part of the final Melting Pot (Jazztopad) platform in Wrocław and the composition "Some Kind Of Greek Story" based on Delphic sentences, commissioned by Casa de Musica in Porto. In addition to orchestral, chamber and solo works, he also creates theatre and film music ("The Scent of Lviv" by Grzegorz Korczak).

He is a co-composer of the European jazz anthem for the 25th anniversary of the European Jazz Network. As a composer and arranger, he also collaborates with the educational section of the National Forum of Music.

Educational activities 
Damasiewicz worked at the Music Academy in Zanzibar, where he was the artistic director. From 2006 to 2007, he conducted a brass band at the Ryszard Bukowski State Secondary Music School in Wrocław, as well as lectures and courses on improvisation and creation of a musical work, including at the Summer Music Academy in Łódź, and also as a guest at the Karol Lipiński Music Academy in Wrocław. In addition, as a teacher, arranger and conductor, he co-created the orchestral project "Wszystko Gra" with Władysław Kosendiak, in cooperation with the Lower Silesian Music Society.

He studied at the academies of music in Wrocław (Akademia Muzyczna im. Karola Lipińskiego we Wrocławiu), Bydgoszcz (Akademia Muzyczna im. Feliksa Nowowiejskiego w Bydgoszczy) and Katowice (Akademia Muzyczna w Katowicach) He founded the ‘Music According To Art Association’ (MATA) which promotes artists looking for alternative solutions in music and art. In his musical work, he references the languages of modal jazz, free jazz, European classical music, new European improvised music, sound art and electroacoustic improvisation.

At present 
Currently under the name of Piotr Damasiewicz Viennese Connections, he collaborates with musicians associated with the Austrian jazz scene such as Thomas Stempkowski, Krzysztof Kasprzyk and Aleksander Yannilos. He also collaborates with musicians from the Berlin music scene, such as Emilio Gordoa ("Hangar Music") and Samuel Hall ("Power Of The Horns"), as well as a trio with Paweł Szpura and Zbigniew Kozera referring to the musicians' ethnic journeys ("Into the Roots"). He also collaborates with European groups, Spinifex and Red Trio, including a duet with the pianist Rodrigo Pihneiro.

Collaborations 
Artists with whom Piotr Damasiewicz has performed include: David Murray, Jason Moran, James Carter, Tomasz Stanko, Lotte Anker, Magda Mayas, Phil Minton, Jeb Bishop, Andrzej Bauer, Dave Rempis, Michael Zerang, Paul Nilsen Lowe, Skalpel, Jon Falt, Satoko Fuji, Morihide Sawada, Hans Koch, Joker Nies, Kazuhisa Uhichashi, Rodrigo Amado, Zdzisław Piernik, Per Zanussi, Marcin Masecki, Cezary Duchnowski, Josh Sinton, Betina Wenzel, Wolfgang Reisinger, Eduardo Maraffa, Mathias Muche. He also collaborated with Maciej Garbowski and the Aukso chamber orchestra. He frequently collaborates with Maciej Obara and Dominik Wania.

Bands and projects

As leader 

 Piotr Damasiewicz Into The Roots
 Power Of The Horns
 Hadrons
 ImproGraphic
 Mnemotaksja
 Piotr Damasiewicz Quintet
 Art Escape Quintet

As co-author with Gerard Lebik 

 VeNN Circles
 Este Mutual Group
 Red Trio Quintet (Red Trio/Damasiewicz/Lebik)

As multicultural curator 

 Festival Art Meeting in Lviv
 Art platform Melting Pot in Wrocław (Jazztopad)

Collaboration with different artistic platforms and projects 

 Take Five European Project
 Polish German coproduction of Avant Art Festival
 Gerngesehen and Mex
 JazzPlayesEurope
 Composer in the celebration of 25 anniversary of the European Jazz Network
 International improvised music summit Alpenglow III/Styria Meets Wrocław
 Tilde-Polish Experimental Music tour in Scandinavia
 Jazztopad - USA and Canada tour

Awards 

 Scholarship holder of the Minister of Culture and National Heritage
 Winner of the Fryderyk 2013 phonographic award
 Winner of the Wareto Award granted by Gazeta Wyborcza
 Winner of the Wrocław Music Award
 Laureate of the Krzysztof Komeda composer competition
 Artistic scholarship of the Mayor of Wrocław
 Winner of the Jazz2020 plebiscite in the Album of the Year category according to readers and listeners of Jazzpress and Radiojazz
 Winner of the Jazz2020 plebiscite in the Artist of the Year category according to the readers and listeners of Jazzpress and Radiojazz
 Trumpeter of the year in the "Jazz Forum" Jazz Top 2020 in the critics' poll
 Trumpeter of the year in Jazz Top "Jazz Forum" 2021 in the readers' poll
 "Watra" in the ranking of top 10 Polish jazz albums 2021 according to Polska Płyta / Polska Muzyka
 "Watra" ranked 1st in the poll for the Best Polish Jazz Album 2021 organized by Ether Jazz
 "Watra" took 3rd place in the JazzPRESS 2021 editorial ranking
 Artist of the Year 2021 in the ranking of the readers of JazzPRESS and listeners of RadioJAZZ.FM in the category of Polish jazz musician

Selected discography

As leader

As co -founder

As a sideman

Other 
Damasiewicz has been artistic director of Music Academy (DCMA) on Zanzibar. (2018)

He also composes soundtracks for movies and theatrical performances. One of the most important work is the movie soundtrack “The Smell of Lviv”.

References 

Polish musicians
1980 births
Living people